Willie Coonley Savea Tuitama (born January 13, 1987) is a former American football quarterback.

Early life
Tuitama was born in Stockton, California. His father was originally from American Samoa; Tuitama and his sister were raised in the Church of Jesus Christ of Latter-day Saints. Tuitama attended St. Mary's High School. In 2005, he was ranked by SuperPrep All-America, its No. 16 quarterback. He received PrepStar All-America honors, as well as votes in the Long Beach Press-Telegram Best in the West Poll. Named Cal-Hi Sports third-team All-State.

As a Senior, he completed 158 of 254 passes for 2,734 yards, with 32 touchdowns, with only 7 interceptions. He led St. Mary's to California's Division I sectional championship, beating Nevada Union High School, 50-45 with Tuitama completing his last 11 passes. He had no incompletions in the second half. His team finished 13-1 and Tuitama led the league in passing yards, completing 17 of 23 passes for career highs of 312 yards and five touchdowns in his final prep game. 

Following the year he was named a Max Emfinger top 30 dropback QB list with 4.5 stars, CollegeFootballnews.com No. 12 QB prospect nationally. He was a two-year letterman in football and once in baseball. He was also named a Rivals.com 4-star prospect.

College career
Tuitama was offered scholarships from the Washington Huskies and Arizona Wildcats. He chose Arizona, where he majored in family studies and human development. During his tenure at Arizona he would set several school records, all of which were subsequently broken by Nick Foles, except career touchdowns (67) which they are tied.

Professional career
Despite being named MVP of the 2008 Las Vegas Bowl, he went undrafted in the 2009 NFL Draft. 

Some analysis and media outlets reported his ill-timed DUI arrest in March 2009 and guilty plea in June of that year may have been considered a factor.

Nebraska Danger
Tuitama began his professional career with the Nebraska Danger of the Indoor Football League.

Allen Wranglers
Tuitama played for the Allen Wranglers for the later part of the 2012 season.

Return to Nebraska
Tuitama re-signed with the Danger for the 2013 season, but did not report to training camp.

References

1987 births
American football quarterbacks
Arizona Wildcats football players
Nebraska Danger players
Living people
American sportspeople of Samoan descent
Players of American football from Stockton, California
Allen Wranglers players
San Antonio Talons players